Liberty Landing may refer to:

Liberty Landing, Alberta, a residential community in the hamlet of Gasoline Alley in Red Deer County, Alberta, Canada
Liberty Landing Ferry, a water taxi servicing Liberty State Park
Liberty Landing Marina, the marina at Liberty State Park, Jersey City, New Jersey